Helmut Fath (24 May 1929, Ursenbach – 19 June 1993, Heidelberg) was a German sidecar racer and engineer. He won the Sidecar World Championship in 1960 and 1968. His early racing was on BMW R50 sidecars with a chassis of his own design. After a bad accident in 1961, he took time off and returned with his own design URS four-cylinder machine to win the title in 1968. The URS engine was also used in solo competition as well as powering Horst Owesle/Peter Rutterford to the 1971 World Sidecar Championship.

References

External links
http://www.classic-motorrad.de/v25/stories/166-2010-fath-denkmal-ursenbach
http://www.classic-motorrad.de/galerie/displayimage.php?album=84&pos=65

Isle of Man TT riders
German motorcycle racers
1993 deaths
1929 births
Sidecar racers